Ahmed Mubarak H.S. Al Shafi (أحمد مبارك آل شافي) (or spelled as Ahmad) (born 21 October 1974) is a former Qatari footballer.

He played the 1998 FIFA World Cup qualification match against Saudi Arabia on 11 October 1997.

He also played at 1991 FIFA U-17 World Championship.

External links

1974 births
Living people
Qatari footballers
Qatar international footballers
Al-Rayyan SC players
Qatar Stars League players
Association footballers not categorized by position
Footballers at the 1994 Asian Games
Asian Games competitors for Qatar